The historic city of Fremantle, Western Australia has many walking tours and trails. A variety of books and pamphlets describe these trails.

The walking through or around Fremantle is celebrated in at least one song,  and also had involved competitions in 1893.

The City of Fremantle has had "heritage events" which have included special tours and walks, as well as explorations of the city heritage.

Fremantle heritage is not without its controversies and regular public debates have occurred over demolition of historic buildings and sites, as well as overall policy in relation to heritage of Fremantle.

The debates and controversies have usually involved the Fremantle Society, politicians, members of the city council and other public groups.

Some issues over the decades have seen significant loss of heritage in the City area, but despite the losses, sufficient streetscapes and evidence of cultural heritage remain, and there is a good facility for the heritage to be recorded and written up.

Books 
Books from the 1960s such as Birch's are both "a handbook and official guide".
The Education Department of WA published a guide in 1980.
The 1987 Louis Vuitton Cup and the 1987 America's Cup challenge changed the Fremantle landscape. 

David Hutchison's Fremantle Walks and his earlier book from 1986 provide a well based set of information about the features of Fremantle.

Specific sections of Fremantle such as the "West End" and other parts have been isolated in specific books such Seddon's 2000 publication Looking at an old suburb.
In the 2000s, books such as Richard and Moira's Freo footsteps appeared.

Annual events 
The local university, Notre Dame, holds its annual commencement walk around the streets of the West End of Fremantle.

City of Fremantle 
The city has provided over time maps and guides as to walking around Fremantle.

The City of Fremantle has engaged consultants to review the objects and subjects of tours and events, such as the 1995 report.

Fremantle Trails 
The City of Fremantle has a set of Fremantle Trails ranging through a range of subjects:

 C. Y. O'Connor trail
 Convict trail
 Discovery trail
 Fremantle cemetery trail
 Fishing Boat Harbour trail
 Hotels and Breweries walk
 Water front trail
 Writers walk
 Freopedia Heritage Tour

Walking the City 

David Hutchison's 2006 Fremantle Walks includes the following themed subjects with maps.

 Victoria Quay

 Arthur Head

 The Esplanade and Boat Harbours

 The West End

 Market Street to the Cappuccino Strip

 Kings Square

 St Patrick's Basilica Precinct

 Fremantle Prison

 Memorial Park, Monument Hill

Other tours and guides 
At various stages in Fremantle history, there have been events and special tours that have been isolated single events.

Also tourism promotion guides that do not identify specific trails have been published over decades as "what's on" and are basically advertising for businesses prepared to be included.

Walking tours 
More recently organised tours are provided by providers such as Two Feet and a Heartbeat and other groups.

Freopedia 
The Freopedia project for having QR-coded signs at significant historic buildings and sites throughout Fremantle was a project that originated outside of Fremantle, and saw the collaboration between The Fremantle Society, Wikimedia Australia, the Fremantle City Council as well as the State Records Office, Fremantle Business Improvement District, Fremantle Port Authority, and other organisations in Fremantle.  The QR signs link to the articles in Wikipedia about the buildings and the sites marked.

Notes

External links
 Fremantle walking trails 

Fremantle
Heritage trails in Western Australia
Tourist attractions in Perth, Western Australia